The 1978 Vuelta a España was the 33rd edition of the Vuelta a España, one of cycling's Grand Tours. The Vuelta began in Gijón, with a prologue individual time trial on 25 April, and Stage 10 occurred on 5 May with a stage to Calafell. The race finished in San Sebastián on 14 May.

Prologue
25 April 1978 — Gijón to Gijón,  (ITT)

Stage 1
26 April 1978 — Gijón to Gijón,

Stage 2
27 April 1978 — Gijón to Cangas de Onís,

Stage 3
28 April 1978 — Cangas de Onís to León,

Stage 4
29 April 1978 — León to Valladolid,

Stage 5
30 April 1978 — Valladolid to Ávila,

Stage 6
1 May 1978 — Torrelaguna to Torrejón de Ardoz,

Stage 7
2 May 1978 — Torrejón de Ardoz to Cuenca,

Stage 8
3 May 1978 — Cuenca to Benicàssim,

Stage 9
4 May 1978 — Benicàssim to Tortosa,

Stage 10
5 May 1978 — Tortosa to Calafell,

References

1978 Vuelta a España
Vuelta a España stages